The Battle of Dadosesani Land, also known as the Battle of Dadosesani Forest, was the battle fought on 1 September 1015 during the German–Polish War, between the army of the Duchy of Poland led by Bolesław I the Brave, against the army of the Holy Roman Empire led by Henry II, Gero, and Gero II. It was fought in Lower Silesia, on the land that belonged to the Dadosesani tribe. It was won by Poland, while German forces had retreated.

Background 
In 1015, the forces of the Holy Roman Empire under the command of the emperor Henry II, managed to break through the defensive lines of the Duchy of Poland, in the Battle of Krosno Odrzańskie. At the same time, the campaign of the Duchy of Bohemia against Poland has been stopped by Moravians allied with Poland, and the armies the Duchy of Saxony and Confederacy of the Veleti had retreated after pillaging the border regions of Poland. In that situation, German forces become threatened by Polish armies, which made Henry II order his army to retreat back to the Holy Roman Empire.

The battle 
While retreating, the German army had established a camp in Lower Silesia, at the lands that belonged to Dadosesani tribe. Threatened with being surrounded by Polish army, Henry II had retreated with most of his army, going through the swamp, on the improvised bridge. In the camp was left only with the rearguard units, that were commanded by  Gero, Archbishop of Magdeburg, and Gero II, Margrave of the Saxon Ostmark. The units got surrounded by the Polish army and destroyed after three attacks. 200 German soldiers have been killed during the fight, including Gero II.

Aftermatch 
The rest of the German army managed to retreat from the battle and was subsequently chased by the Polish forces. During the chase, the Polish army attempted to conquer Meissen, however, they were stopped by flooding Elbe river.

Citations

Notes

References

Bibliography 
 K. Olejnik: Cedynia, Niemcza, Głogów, Krzyszków. Kraków: Wydawnictwo KAW, 1988, ISBN 83-03-02038-2.
 R.F. Barkowski, Bitwy Słowian. Warsaw: Bellona, 2018, ISBN 978-83-11-15537-4.

Dadosesani Land
Dadosesani Land
Dadosesani Land
Dadosesani Land
10th century in Poland